José Adolfo Fernández Dübrock is a Chilean forest engineer and politician of German descent. Between 2019 and 2020 he served as Mayor of the Region of Magallanes and Chilean Antarctica, under the second government of Sebastián Piñera.

Career
He graduated as a forestry engineer from the University of Chile.

He served as Regional Director of the CONAF of Magallanes during the first government of President Sebastián Piñera and as Regional Counselor for 12 years.

In 2018, he assumed Seremi de Agricultura de Magallanes y la Antártica Chilena, a position he held until his appointment as Mayor of that region. He stepped down from this responsibility on September 21, 2020.

References

Chilean politicians
Living people
Year of birth missing (living people)
Chilean foresters
University of Chile alumni